Laws of succession govern the order of succession to various monarchies.  Some laws of succession include:

Current monarchies

United Kingdom
British succession
Act of Settlement 1701

Japan
Imperial Household Law

Norway
Norwegian Law of Succession

Thailand
1924 Palace Law of Succession

Spain
Law of Succession to the Headship of the State

Former monarchies

France
Kings of France
Salic law
 Legitimist claimants to the throne of France
 Orléanist claimants to the throne of France
 Bonapartist claimants to the throne of France
 Jacobite claimants to the throne of France

Russia
Russian law of succession 1797

General
Agnatic succession
Elective monarchy
Primogeniture
Proximity of blood
Ultimogeniture
Tanistry